Secernentea was a class of nematodes in the Classical Phylogeny System (Chitwood, 1958) and is no longer in use. This morphological-based classification system has been replaced by the Modern Phylogeny system, where taxonomy assignment is based on small subunit ribosomal DNA (SSU rDNA). 

Characteristics of Secernentea are:

 Amphid apertures are pore/slit-like
 Derids are present in some; located near nerve ring
 Phasmids are present; posterior
 Excretory system is tubular
 Cuticle is striated in two to four layers; lateral field is present
 Three esophageal glands; esophageal structure varies
 Males generally have one testis
 Caudal alae are common
 Sensory papillae are cephalic only; may be caudal papillae in males
 Mostly terrestrial
 Rarely found in fresh or marine water

Systematics

Subclasses and orders of Secernentea are:

 Subclass Rhabditia (paraphyletic?)
 Rhabditida
 Strongylida
 Subclass Spiruria
 Ascaridida
 Camallanida (sometimes included in Spirurida)
 Drilonematida (sometimes included in Spirurida)
 Oxyurida (= Rhabdiasida)
 Rhigonematida (formerly in Tylenchia)
 Spirurida
 Subclass Diplogasteria (may belong in Rhabditia)
 Diplogasterida
 Subclass Tylenchia (may belong in Rhabditia)
 Aphelenchida
 Tylenchida

Some families traditionally considered to be Rhabditida seem to be closer to the Tylenchida. If the Tylenchia are to be maintained as separate, they probably will be included therein.

References

 
Protostome classes
Obsolete animal taxa